Cape Lankester is a high, rounded, snow-covered cape at the south side of the entrance to Mulock Inlet, along the west edge of the Ross Ice Shelf. It was discovered by the British National Antarctic Expedition, 1901–04, and probably named for Sir Edwin Ray Lankester, Director of the British Museum (Natural History) (1898–1907) and founder of the Marine Biological Association in 1884.

References

Headlands of the Ross Dependency
Hillary Coast